The Second pandemic may refer to:

Second plague pandemic (1350), also known as the Black Death
Second cholera pandemic (1829–1849)

See also
"Pandemic 2: The Startling" (South Park) 2008 season 12 episode 11, part 2 of 2
Pandemic (disambiguation)
First pandemic (disambiguation)
Third pandemic (disambiguation)
Fourth pandemic
Fifth pandemic
Sixth pandemic
Seventh pandemic